The discography of American rock band Nothing More consists of six studio albums, one compilation album, one extended play, eight singles, and twelve music videos. While recording a number of lower profile independent releases through the 2000s, the band did not receive widespread attention for their releases until signing to the Eleven Seven record label in 2014. Since then, the band has had two studio albums that charted on the Billboard 200 all-format charts, Nothing More (2014) and The Stories We Tell Ourselves (2017). Additionally, the band has had eight charting singles on the Billboard Mainstream Rock songs chart, including "Go to War", which topped the chart for a week in November 2017.

Albums

Studio albums

Compilation albums

Extended plays

Singles

Promotional singles

Music videos

References

Heavy metal group discographies
Discographies of American artists